Pisidium casertanum, the pea cockle or pea clam, is a minute freshwater bivalve mollusc of the family Sphaeriidae.

Description 
The shell is broad, sub-triangular or oval and is ornamented with sculpture of faint concentric striations. The umbos are slightly behind the middle. The Periostracum is silky, scarcely glossy. In colour it is whitish to grey-brown and often the shell is coated with reddish-brown deposits.

The shell is of similar shape to Sphaerium novaezelandiae but is smaller as an adult, more inflated, with a deeper hinge-plate, stronger teeth, and the ligament is not visible externally.

Length is up to 4.5 mm, height 3.7 mm, and thickness 2.3 mm.

Distribution
It has a cosmopolitan distribution and is perhaps the world's widely distributed non-marine mollusc.

 British Isles - common
Ireland
 Czech Republic - in Bohemia, in Moravia, least concern (LC)
 Slovakia
 Germany - distributed in whole Germany. High endangered (Stark gefährdet) in Hesse, critically endangered (vom Aussterben bedroht) in Saxony. Pisidium casertanum ponderosum endangered (gefährdet) in Brandenburg.
 Latvia
 Netherlands
 New Zealand - common
 Nordic countries: Denmark, Faroes, Finland, Iceland, Norway and Sweden
 Poland

References

External links
Pisidium casertanum at Animalbase taxonomy, biology,status (threats), images
Pisidium casertanum images at  Consortium for the Barcode of Life
 photo

casertanum
Bivalves described in 1791
Taxa named by Giuseppe Saverio Poli